Ivan Konrad Trajkovič (born 1 September 1991 in Zagreb, Croatia) is a Slovenian taekwondo athlete. He competed at the 2012 Summer Olympics in the +80 kg category where he lost in preliminary round to Cha Dong-Min of South Korea. 

He represented Slovenia at the 2020 Summer Olympics in the men's +80 kg event, losing the bronze medal match to another South Korean taekwondo-jin, In Kyo-don.

References

External links
 

1991 births
Living people
Slovenian male taekwondo practitioners
Olympic taekwondo practitioners of Slovenia
Taekwondo practitioners at the 2012 Summer Olympics
Taekwondo practitioners at the 2015 European Games
Sportspeople from Zagreb
European Games competitors for Slovenia
European Taekwondo Championships medalists
World Taekwondo Championships medalists
Taekwondo practitioners at the 2020 Summer Olympics
21st-century Slovenian people